Life in Exile after Abdication is the second album by Moe Tucker, released in 1989.

Production
Rather than performing all of the instruments herself, as on her debut album, Tucker is accompanied by Lou Reed, Jad Fair, Daniel Johnston, and all four members of Sonic Youth.

Critical reception
Robert Christgau wrote that "'Work,' 'Spam Again,' and 'Hey Mersh!' are Amerindie knockouts, lived postpunk takes on the grind and release of lower-middle class adulthood, a subject rock and rollers usually leave to Nashville company men." Trouser Press wrote that "Tucker’s loose and unpredictable Life in Exile offers a little of everything, all performed and recorded with ramshackle casualness." The Chicago Reader called the album "a tour de force recording that wedded noisy indie guitar textures to songs of blue-collar rage, fueled by [Tucker's] years as a divorced mother of five trying to support her family on a Wal-Mart paycheck." The Washington Post wrote that "anyone who ever loved Maureen Tucker -- and that surely includes all true Velvet fans -- will find Life in Exile, motley as it is, irresistible." The Spin Alternative Record Guide deemed the album Tucker's "finest solo outing." The New Yorker thought that the album "demonstrated an abiding love for Bo Diddley rock and girl-group pop, played as if by dinosaurs and sung as if by a choirgirl."

Reed selected the album as one of his "picks of 1989".

Track listing
All tracks written by Moe Tucker except where noted.
 "Hey Mersh!" – 3:16
 Maureen Tucker – vocals, guitar
 Lou Reed – lead guitar
 Kate Messer – guitar
 Hank Beckmeyer – guitar, bass
 Joe Martinelli – drums
 Scott Jarvis – drums
 "Spam Again" – 5:25
 Maureen Tucker – vocals, guitar, percussion
 Jad Fairs – lead guitar, percussion
 Kate Messer – 12-string guitar, percussion
 Hank Beckmeyer – slide guitar, percussion
 Scott Jarvis – drums
 Kim Gordon – percussion
 M. C. Kostek – percussion
 "Goodnight Irene" (Huddie Ledbetter, John A. Lomax) – 2:29
 Maureen Tucker – lead vocals, guitar
 Kate Messer – backing vocals
 Hank Beckmeyer – backing vocals
 Joe Martinelli – backing vocals
 "Chase" – 8:07
 Thurston Moore – guitar, arrangement
 Lee Ranaldo – guitar, arrangement
 Hank Beckmeyer – guitar, arrangement
 Kim Gordon – bass, arrangement
 Maureen Tucker – drums, arrangement
 Jad Fairs – cymbals, arrangement
 Kate Messer – congas, arrangement
 "Andy" – 5:08
 Maureen Tucker – vocals, guitar, piano
 Hank Beckmeyer – guitar
 Jad Fairs – guitar
 Kate Messer – acoustic guitar
 "Work" – 3:38
 Maureen Tucker – vocals
 Hank Beckmeyer – lead guitar, bass
 Kate Messer – guitar
 Barry Stock – bass
 Scott Jarvis – drums
 "Pale Blue Eyes" (Lou Reed) – 6:44
 Maureen Tucker – lead and backing vocals, drums, guitar
 Lou Reed – lead guitar, backing vocals
 Hank Beckmeyer – guitar, backing vocals
 Kim Gordon – bass, backing vocals
 Jad Fair – backing vocals
 Kate Messer – backing vocals
 Scott Jarvis – backing vocals
 Daniel Johnston – backing vocals
 Rob Elk – backing vocals
 Don Fleming – backing vocals
 "Bo Diddley" (Ellas McDaniel) – 5:07
 Maureen Tucker – lead and backing vocals, guitar
 Kim Gordon – bass, backing vocals
 Steve Shelley – drums
 Kate Messer – backing vocals
 Hank Beckmeyer – backing vocals
 Scott Jarvis – backing vocals
 Jad Fairs – backing vocals
 "Talk So Mean" – 4:59
 Maureen Tucker – vocals, guitar
 Kate Messer – 12-string guitar
 Ann Marie Ear – piano
 Kim Gordon – bass
 Scott Jarvis – drums
 "Do it Right" (Jad Fair, Daniel Johnston) – 3:10
 Maureen Tucker – vocals
 Daniel Johnston – vocals, piano
Moejadkatebarry Bonus Tacks
 "Guess I'm Falling in Love" [Lou Reed, John Cale, Sterling Morrison, Moe Tucker)
 "Baby What You Want Me To Do" (Jimmy Reed)
 "Why Don't You Smile Now?" (Lou Reed, John Cale, Vance, Phillips)
 "Hey, Mr. Rain" (Lou Reed, John Cale, Sterling Morrison, Maureen Tucker)

Personnel

 Maureen Tucker: Vocals on all tracks except track 6, guitar on all tracks except 4, 6, 10, percussion on track 2, drums on track 4, 7, piano on track 5
 Kate Messer: Guitar on tracks 1, 6, 12 string guitar on tracks 2, 9 percussion on track 2, backing vocals on tracks 3, 7, 8, congas on track 4, acoustic guitar on track 5
 Hank Beckmeyer: Guitar on tracks 1, 4, 5, 7, backing vocals on tracks 3, 7, 8, Bass on tracks 1, 6, Slide Guitar & Percussion on track 2, lead guitar on 6
 Scott Jarvis: Drums on tracks 1, 2, 6, 9, backing vocals on 7, 8

Guest Musicians 

 Jad Fair: Lead Guitar & Percussion on track 2, cymbals on track 4, guitar on track 5, backing vocals on 7 - 8
 Kim Gordon: Percussion on track 2, Bass on track 4, 7, 8, 9, backing vocals on 7, 8
 Lou Reed: Lead Guitar on 1, 7, backing vocals on 7 
 Joe Martinelli: Drums on 1, backing vocals on 3
 Daniel Johnston: Backing Vocals on 7, Vocals & Piano on 10 
 M. C. Kostek: Percussion on 2
 Thurston Moore & Lee Ranaldo: Guitar on 4
 Barry Stock: Bass on 6
 Rob Elk & Don Fleming: Backing vocals on 7
 Ann Marie Ear: Piano on 9

References

1989 albums
Maureen Tucker albums
Albums produced by Maureen Tucker
50 Skidillion Watts albums